Robert Baddeley may refer to:

 Robert Baddeley (actor) (1733–1794), English actor
 Robert Baddeley (British Army officer) (born 1934), British soldier